1000 Homo DJs was a side project of American industrial rock band Ministry. The project released two singles, one of which featured a cover of Black Sabbath's "Supernaut".

1000 Homo DJs began as a side project to release outtakes from Ministry's The Land of Rape and Honey. The credits read "Another Luxa/Pan Production", which was the production pseudonym for Ministry members Al Jourgensen and Paul Barker.

Origin of name
In a 2004 interview, Jourgensen explained that when he played demos (presumably those which became Apathy) for Wax Trax! co-owner Jim Nash, the latter replied, "No one's gonna buy this. It'll take one thousand homo DJs to play this for one person to buy it."

However, according to the Wax Trax! box set Black Box released in 1994, Jourgensen and Nash were in the label's office listening to an unauthorized remix of the Revolting Cocks' (Jourgensen's former band) single "We Shall Cleanse the World". Nash comforted Jourgensen, who disapproved of the remix's existence, by assuring him that it would only ever be heard by "a thousand homo DJs".

Members
The members of 1000 Homo DJs were identified by pseudonyms in the CD liner notes. However, most of their identities are fairly certain.

Buck Satan: Al Jourgensen
Officer Agro: speculated to be Jeff Ward, but possibly Paul Barker or Martin Atkins
Ike Krull: Mike Scaccia
The Temple of Drool Choir: Mike O'Connell, Wes Kidd, Brian St. Clair, Herb Rosen, Joe Kelly, David "Slash" Weidman, Jerry Rodgers
Wee Willie Reefer: William Rieflin
Viva Nova: also known as Mel'Amour and P.A.M., and later known as Vivanovachicago, but often misidentified as Patty Jourgensen
Count Ringworm: Jello Biafra
Viktor LaMent

Trent Reznor's involvement
The nature of Nine Inch Nails frontman Trent Reznor's contribution to 1000 Homo DJs' records has been debated. What is certain is that Reznor recorded the original vocals for "Supernaut". This performance was not officially used because Reznor's label, TVT Records, refused to allow his appearance on the release. Reznor's version would ultimately be released as "Supernaut (Trent Reznor Vocal Version)" by TVT four years later on the retrospective Black Box - Wax Trax! Records: The First 13 Years, following TVT's purchase of Wax Trax!.

Jourgensen's immediate response to TVT's ultimatum is uncertain. An oft-repeated story tells that instead of recording new vocals, Jourgensen merely ran Reznor's performance through a distortion effect to mask its identity. According to this story, every WaxTrax! recording of "Supernaut" contains Reznor's vocals. However, a dissenting group claims this is an urban legend, and that Jourgensen did record new vocals for the EP—albeit in a similar style to Reznor's initial performance. Statements made by both Reznor and Jourgensen seem to confirm the latter view. In a 1992 Prodigy post regarding "Supernaut", Reznor said, [I] finally told Al to redo it without me. The version that Wax Trax put out is Al, the version on the NIN [bootleg] single is me. Reznor referred to the two-track Suck bootleg, which contained the recording of "Supernaut" that later appeared on Black Box. Jourgensen made a similar statement in a 2003 interview. When asked whose vocals appear on "Supernaut", Jourgensen replied, referring to the WaxTrax! EP, Black Box, and Greatest Fits versions, respectively (and corroborating that only the "Trent Reznor Vocal Version" contained Reznor's performance, and that Jourgensen in fact sang on most versions of the song): That would be me on the original, on WaxTrax! The later version released on TVT was Trent Reznor... then the remixed version had my vocals on it.

Discography

Singles
"Apathy" 12" single (1988, Wax Trax! Records)
"Supernaut" 12" single/CD single (1990, Wax Trax! Records)

Compilation appearances
"Supernaut" on Pure Devotion (1992, Devotion)
"Supernaut (Trent Reznor Vocal Version)" on Black Box - Wax Trax! Records: The First 13 Years (1994, Wax Trax! Records)
"Supernaut" on Nativity in Black: Tribute to Black Sabbath (1994, Columbia Records)
"Supernaut" on Moshpit Madness (1994, SPG Music Productions Ltd.)
"Supernaut" on The Black Bible (1998, Cleopatra Records)
"Supernaut" (remixed) on Ministry's Greatest Fits (2001, Warner Bros. Records)
"Supernaut" on Hardest Hits - Modern Rock of the 80s (2003, SPG Music Productions Ltd.)
"Apathy", "Supernaut", "Better Ways" and "Hey Asshole" on Ministry's Side Trax (2004, Rykodisc)
"Supernaut" (remixed) on Ministry & Co-Conspirators' Cover Up (2008, 13th Planet Records)
"Apathy", "Supernaut", "Better Ways", "Hey Asshole", "Supernaut (Trent Vocal)" and "Supernaut (Dub Mix)" on Ministry's Trax! Box (2014, Cleopatra Records)
"Supernaut (Die Krupps Remix)" on Occult Box (2015, Cleopatra Records)

References

External links
 Discography and artist page at CyberNoise

Musical groups established in 1988
Musical groups disestablished in 1990
1988 establishments in Illinois
1990 disestablishments in Illinois
American industrial rock musical groups
Trent Reznor
Wax Trax! Records artists